Gary B. Pruitt (born c. 1957) is an American attorney and businessman, previously serving as the President and CEO of the Associated Press. He previously served as the CEO, president, and chairman of the board of McClatchy, an American publishing company that operates 29 daily newspapers in fourteen states.

Early life and education 
Pruitt was born in Virginia and raised in Satellite Beach, Florida. He earned a Bachelor of Arts degree from the University of Florida, Masters of Public Policy from University of California, Berkeley, and a Juris Doctor from the UC Berkeley School of Law.

Career 
Pruitt was counsel for McClatchy from 1984 to 1987, corporate Secretary and General Counsel from 1987 to 1998, publisher for The Fresno Bee from 1991 to 1994, general counsel from 1987 to 1991, and Vice President for Operations and Technology from 1991 to 1994. He was Chief Operating Officer from 1995 to 1996. He became President starting in 1995, Chief Executive Officer in 1996, and Chairman in 2001.

In April 2012 it was announced he would become CEO of the Associated Press. Kevin McClatchy assumed his chairman of the board role and Patrick J. Talamantes assumed the CEO role.

He is a former chairman of the Newspaper Association of America and James Irvine Foundation, and a former vice chairman of the Associated Press Board of Directors. He serves on the Advisory Board of the USC Annenberg School Center on Communication Leadership & Policy.

References

1957 births
Living people
University of California, Berkeley alumni
UC Berkeley School of Law alumni
People from Satellite Beach, Florida
University of Florida alumni
McClatchy people
American chief operating officers
Associated Press people
American chief executives in the media industry
Satellite High School alumni